The 1944 Army Cadets football team was an American football team that represented the United States Military Academy as an independent during the 1944 college football season. In their fourth season under head coach Earl Blaik, the Cadets compiled a perfect 9–0 record and outscored opponents by a total of 504 to 35. Army's 1944 season was part of a 32-game undefeated streak that included the entire 1944, 1945, and 1946 seasons.

In the final AP Poll released on December 5, Army was ranked No. 1 nationally with 1,165 points, more than 200 points ahead of No. 2 Ohio State. In retroactive analyses, Army has also been recognized as the 1944 national champion by most other selectors, including the Billingsley Report, Boand System, College Football Researchers Association, Dunkel System, Helms Athletic Foundation, Houlgate System, National Championship Foundation, Poling System, and Sagarin Ratings. Army also won the Lambert Trophy as the best football team in the east.

Army halfback Glenn Davis received the Maxwell Award as the best college football player of 1944. Davis and fullback Doc Blanchard were selected as consensus first-team players on the 1944 All-America college football team. 

Six persons affiliated with the 1944 Army team were later inducted into the College Football Hall of Fame: head coach Blaik (inducted 1964); Blanchard (inducted 1959); Davis (inducted 1961); end Barney Poole (inducted 1974); quarterback Doug Kenna (inducted 1984); and guard John Green (inducted 1989).

The team captain was Tom Lombardo. Other notable players included tackle Tex Coulter, guard Joe Stanowicz, and center Robert St. Onge.

Schedule

References

Army
Army Black Knights football seasons
College football national champions
College football undefeated seasons
Lambert-Meadowlands Trophy seasons
Army Cadets football